The name Ma-on has been used for four tropical cyclones in the Western Pacific Ocean. This name was provided by Hong Kong, and is the name of a peak in New Territories.

Typhoon Ma-on (2004) (T0422, 26W, Rolly) – made landfall on Japan's Izu Peninsula, killing 6 people.
Typhoon Ma-on (2011) (T1106, 08W, Ineng) – struck Shikoku in Japan before recurving to the open sea.
Tropical Storm Ma-on (2016) (T1624, 27W) – stayed at sea through its duration.
Tropical Storm Ma-on (2022) (T2209, 10W, Florita) – affected northern Philippines, South China and northern Vietnam.

Pacific typhoon set index articles